Clinic is a compilation album of the first three EPs by Clinic.

The EPs included are I.P.C. Subeditors Dictate Our Youth (1997) (tracks 1–3), Monkey on Your Back (1998) (tracks 4–6) and Cement Mixer (1998) (tracks 7–9).

Track listing
 "I.P.C. Subeditors Dictate Our Youth" – 3:00
 "Porno" – 3:51
 "D.P." – 1:49
 "Monkey on Your Back" – 2:53
 "D.T." – 2:12
 "Evil Bill" – 3:05
 "Cement Mixer" – 2:49
 "Kimberley" – 3:09
 "Voot" – 2:35

References

External links

1999 compilation albums
Clinic (band) compilation albums
Domino Recording Company compilation albums